Nala Damayanthi is a 1959 Indian Tamil language film produced and directed by Kemparaj Urs. The film stars Kemparaj Urs and P. Bhanumathi. The film was originally made in Telugu with the same title and was released in 1957.

Plot 

Based on a story from the Vana Parva of Mahabharata. Damayanthi is the princess of Vidarbha Kingdom. Nala is the king of Nishadha Kingdom. He is an excellent cook. They love and marry each other and beget two children. But soon they undergo hardships due to Nala losing his kingdom in a game of dice. They get separated but Damayanthi is found and joins her father with her two children. Nala is bitten by a snake and becomes a dwarf. Damayanthi arranges for a fake swayamwara to find her husband. Nala, as a dwarf, attends the ceremony with his master. Damayanthi recognizes him from the food he prepared. Nala is restored to his former self and the couple are reunited.

Cast 
P. Bhanumathi as Damayanthi
Kemparaj as Nala
V. Nagayya as Paakugan
Relangi as Vidhooshagan
Mukkamala as Pushkaran
Jayalakshmi as Neelaveni
Kameswaramma as Gowri
Ramadevi as Kannamma
Seetha as Vannaralakshmi
Lankasathiyam as Vannara Chinnaan
Sri Vathsa as Rudhubarnan
Venkara as Sudevan
Lakshmaiya Chowdri as Kali Purushan

Soundtrack 
Music was composed by B. Gopalam and lyrics were penned by Papanasam Sivan, Kuyilan, Puratchidasan and M. Sundaran.

References

External links 
 

1950s romance films
1950s Tamil-language films
1959 films
Films based on the Mahabharata
Hindu mythological films
Indian romance films